Padde bet  is a village in Kapurthala district of Punjab State, India. The village is administrated by a Sarpanch who is an elected representative of village as per the constitution of India and Panchayati raj (India).

Demography 
According to the report published by Census India in 2011, Padda has 244 houses with total population of 1,057 persons of which 553 are male and 504 females. Literacy rate of Padda is 71.70%, lower than the state average of 75.84%.  The population of children in the age group 0–6 years is 110 which is 10.41% of total population. Child sex ratio is approximately 1000, higher than the state average of 846.

Population data

References

External links
  Villages in Kapurthala
 Kapurthala Villages List

Villages in Kapurthala district